Edward S. Curtis (1868–1952) was an American photographer.

Edward Curtis may also refer to:

Edward Curtis (politician) (1801–1856), U.S. Representative from New York
Edward Curtis (athlete) (1899–1926), American Olympic athlete
Ed Curtis (baseball) (1843–1914), American manager in Major League Baseball
Edward B. Curtis (born 1933), American mathematician
Edward C. Curtis (1865–1920), American politician
Edward Peck Curtis (1897–1987), World War I ace

See also
Edward Curtis Smith (1854–1935), American politician
Edward Curtis Wells (1910–1986), American businessman
Edward Curtiss (1898–1970), American film editor